Dave Nielsen is the former head track and field coach of the men's and women's teams at Idaho State University. Nielsen is known for his pioneering work in the pole vault. As of 2012, Nielsen is entering his 25th year as Head Track and Field Coach. Along with coaching the Bengal track and field athletes and Dragila, Nielsen coached Paul Litchfield and heptathlete Jackie Poulson. He also coached Stacy Dragila, who won a gold medal in the pole vault in the 2000 Summer Olympics. As of 2017, Nielsen has accepted a position at Eastern Washington University as the jumps and multi events coach.

Publications
Neilsen has produced four DVDs: Pole Vault Fundamentals and Techniques, Effective Practice Drills for the Pole Vault, Gymnastics Training for the Pole Vault, and Women’s Pole Vault featuring Stacy Dragila.

He has published many articles on various aspects of the vault, including "Athletics Outstanding Performer – The Vaulting Pole" and "Jump Efficiently".

External links
"Jump Efficiency" by Dave Nielsen
Top of the Game

Idaho State University people
College track and field coaches in the United States
American Olympic coaches
Living people
University of Iowa alumni
Pocatello, Idaho
Year of birth missing (living people)
Eastern Washington University faculty
Idaho State University